53rd Anti-Aircraft Brigade may refer to:
 53rd Anti-Aircraft Rocket Brigade, a Soviet/Russian unit
 53rd (City of London) Heavy Anti-Aircraft Regiment, Royal Artillery, a British Army unit